The men's C-1 1000 metres event was an open-style, individual canoeing event conducted as part of the Canoeing at the 1976 Summer Olympics program.

Medallists

Results

Heats
Fifteen competitors were entered. Held on July 29, the top three finishers in each heat moved on to the semifinals with the others relegated to the repechages.

Repechages
Held on July 29, the top three finisher in each repechage advanced to the semifinals.

Semifinals
Taking place on July 31, the top three finishers in each semifinal advanced to the final.

Final
The final took place on July 31.

Ljubek, fourth at the halfway mark, was the only finalist to paddle the second half of the race faster than the first.

References
1976 Summer Olympics official report Volume 3. p. 184. 
Sports-reference.com 1976 C-1 1000 m results.
Wallechinsky, David and Jaime Loucky (2008). "Canoeing Men's Canadian Singles 1000 Meters". In The Complete Book of the Olympics: 2008 Edition. London: Aurum Press Limited. p. 480.

Men's C-1 1000
Men's events at the 1976 Summer Olympics